= Toxin Reviews =

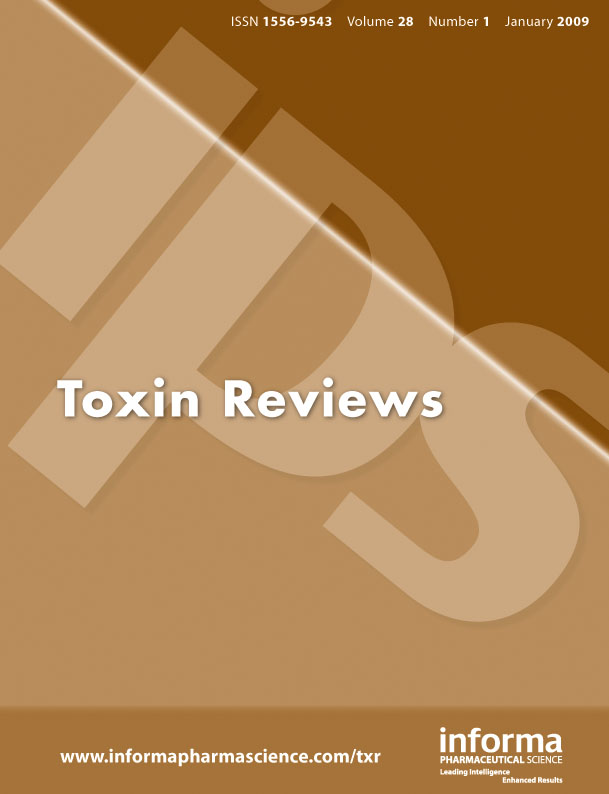
- Discipline: Toxicology
- Language: English
- Edited by: R. Manjunatha Kini

Publication details
- History: 1982-present
- Publisher: Taylor & Francis, Inc.
- Frequency: Quarterly
- Impact factor: 3.840 (2018)

Standard abbreviations
- ISO 4: Toxin Rev.

Indexing
- ISSN: 1556-9543 (print); 1556-9551 (web)

Links
- Journal homepage

Toxin Reviews is a quarterly peer-reviewed medical journal covering research on multidisciplinary research in the area of toxins derived from animals, plants and microorganisms. The aim is to publish reviews that are of broad interest and importance to the toxicology as well as other life science communities. Toxin Reviews aims to encourage scientists to highlight the contribution of toxins as research tools in deciphering molecular and cellular mechanisms, and as prototypes of therapeutic agents. The reviews should emphasize the role of toxins in enhancing our fundamental understanding of life sciences, protein chemistry, structural biology, pharmacology, clinical toxicology and evolution. Moreover, prominence is given to reviews that propose new ideas or approaches and further the knowledge of toxicology. Toxin Reviews delivers up-to-date research on toxins, their characteristics, activities, and mechanisms of action, ranging in scope from new, underutilized substances, through anti-venoms to chemical and biological weapons. It is published by Taylor & Francis Group. The editor-in-chief is R. Manjunatha Kini, National University of Singapore.

The journal has an impact factor of 3.840 (2018) with a H-Index of 38 in the journal category "Toxicology".
